Mizushima is a Japanese surname.

Mizushima may also refer to:

Mizushima, an industrial area in Kurashiki, Okayama
6218 Mizushima
Mitsubishi Mizushima
Mitsubishi Mizushima FC

See also
Battle of Mizushima 
Mizushima Rinkai Railway